Mihkel Pikkur (also Mihkel Pikkor; 13 March 1896 Voltveti Parish (now Saarde Parish), Kreis Pernau – 6 January 1943 Velikiye Luki, Russian SFSR) was an Estonian politician. He was a member of II Riigikogu. He was a member of the Riigikogu since 1 October 1924. He replaced Jüri Visk. On 14 November 1924, he was removed from his position and he was replaced by Johann Põlenik.

References

1896 births
1943 deaths
People from Saarde Parish
People from Kreis Pernau
Workers' United Front politicians
Members of the Riigikogu, 1923–1926
Soviet military personnel killed in World War II